The Monastery of Treskavec, or St. Bogorodica, is a monastery situated on the rocky Mount Zlatovrv, 8 km north of Prilep, in North Macedonia. Built in the 12th century, it currently has only one monk.

The monastery possesses a large collection of Byzantine frescoes. The oldest remaining date from the 15th century.

It was rebuilt in the 14th century by Serbian kings Stefan Milutin and Stefan Dušan. In the mid-16th century it was renovated by knez Dimitrije Pepić (d. 1566) of Kratovo.

The monastery was largely destroyed by a fire in the early 2010s, although the church remained untouched. The rebuilding of the monastery is in the last phase, and it is expected for the monastery to open at this year's Orthodox Easter.

The monastery was the burial place of Serbian noblemen Dabiživ Čihorić and Gradislav Borilović.

Gallery

References

Macedonian Orthodox monasteries
Eastern Orthodox monasteries in North Macedonia
Medieval Serbian Orthodox monasteries
Prilep Municipality
Christian monasteries established in the 12th century
Archbishopric of Ohrid